Souvenir is the eighth studio album by Argentine band Miranda!. Originally planned to be released in 2020 and postponed due to the COVID-19 pandemic, it was released on May 7, 2021, by Sony Music. The album was primarily written and produced by Alejandro Sergi and Cachorro López, with further collaboration with Gabriel Lucena. Guest vocals include Spanish band Sidonie and Chilean musician Javiera Mena. 

Six singles were released from the album: "Me Gustas Tanto", "Un Tiempo", "Casi Feliz", "Luna De Papel", "Entre Las Dos", and "Por Amar Al Amor".

Background and release 
Months after the release of the band's seventh album, Fuerte (2017), they began working on new songs. "Me Gustas Tanto" and "Un Tiempo" were released as singles in July and December 2019 respectively. The as-yet-unnamed album was initially slated for a mid-2020 release, but after the arrival of the COVID-19 pandemic in Argentina, it ended up being postponed to next year, 2021.

On May 1, 2020, the song "Casi Feliz" was released, which was composed to be the theme song for the Netflix series of the same name, starring Sebastián Wainraich and Natalie Pérez. The songs "Luna De Papel" and "Entre Las Dos" were released in August and December of that same year respectively.

"Por Amar Al Amor" was released as the sixth and last single of the album on March 19, 2021. The release date of Souvenir along with its cover art, was announced on April 28, 2021. For the release of the album, an audiovisual showcase was also shared via streaming, in which they presented four songs from the album in a unique format: "Por Amar Al Amor", "Caía La Noche", "Que No Pare" and "Me Gustas Mucho".

Lyrics and composition 
Souvenir is primarily a pop and electropop record, with elements from various musical styles, such as house, dancehall, disco, synth-pop and dub. Through a press release, the singer Alejandro Sergi defined Souvenir as "the beginning of Miranda!'s third life". About the album, he commented that "it is not a return to the beginnings of the band", but a "review of their entire career", where they sought to "do what they always have, but better". He added that it is basically instrumented with machines and software, a few acoustic drums and guitars, "the rest is pure synth, sampling and digital processes". As for the lyrics, the album covers the usual themes, but from a more reflective and less impulsive point of view.

Critical reception 
Shangays writer Agustín Gómez Cascales praised Souvenir for "its luminosity" and for "the strength of its choruses", and described it as a "new delivery of bubbly and exquisite pop". He gave the album 4 stars out of 5.

Accolades

Track listing

Credits and personnel 
Adapted from the album liner notes.
 Alejandro Sergi – lead vocals, production, composition, keyboards, guitar, programming
 Juliana Gattas – lead vocals, composition (2, 4, 6, 9)
 Sindonie – lead vocals (3)
 Javiera Mena – lead vocals (4), programming (4), composition (4)
 Gabriel Lucena – bass (4), programming (9), keyboard (9), composition (9), production (9)
 Ludo Morrel – drums (10)
 Cachorro López – programming (1, 2, 4, 5, 6, 8, 9), keyboards (1, 2, 4, 5, 6, 8, 9), production
 Sebastián Schon – programming (2, 4, 6, 7), keyboards (2, 4, 6, 7)
 Demian Nava –  programming (1, 2, 4, 5, 6, 9), keyboards (1, 2, 4, 5, 6, 9)
 César Sogbe – mixing
 Brad Blackwood – mastering
 Alejandro Ros – graphic design

References 

2021 albums
Spanish-language albums
Miranda! albums
Albums produced by Cachorro López